High Hopes is the third EP by Australian metalcore band the Amity Affliction. The first pressing came in a CD/DVD package with subsequent pressings lacking the DVD. It marks a shift in the band's sound, with the addition of keyboard and samples, as well as acoustic sections. On 23 October 2014 the band released the last 500 copies of the EP on their webstore.

Track listing

Personnel
Credits adapted from the liner notes of High Hopes.

The Amity Affliction
Joel Birch – unclean vocals, artwork
Ahren Stringer – clean vocals, bass
Troy Brady – lead guitar
Chris Burt – rhythm guitar
Trad Nathan – keyboards, synths, programming, samples
Troels Thomasson – drums, percussion

Additional personnel
 Daniel Field - engineering
 Soundhouse Studios - mixing
 David Neil - mastering

Production
 The Amity Affliction (with assistance from Daniel Field)

Notes
This is the first release featuring Ahren Stringer on bass guitar, switching from rhythm guitar.
"Straight Up!" includes content from episode 10 of season 2 of the late 1980s/early 1990s Canadian television series Degrassi High, entitled "Showtime Part 1".
"R.I.P. Steggy" features an audio clip from the film Training Day at the beginning of the song.
"Cut It Out" includes content from the film The Butterfly Effect, and at the end, a snippet from Degrassi High, "Showtime Part 1" and the following episode, "Showtime Part 2".

References

2007 EPs
The Amity Affliction albums